Petro Romanovych Rusak (born 20 November 1970) is a former Ukrainian football player.

Honours
Dinaburg
Latvian Football Cup finalist: 2001

References

1970 births
Living people
Soviet footballers
FC Spartak Ivano-Frankivsk players
Ukrainian footballers
Ukrainian Premier League players
FC Khutrovyk Tysmenytsia players
FC Chernomorets Novorossiysk players
Russian Premier League players
Ukrainian expatriate footballers
Expatriate footballers in Russia
FC Enerhetyk Burshtyn players
Dinaburg FC players
Expatriate footballers in Latvia
FC Prykarpattia Ivano-Frankivsk (1998) players
FC Karpaty Yaremche players

Association football forwards